Kombucha (also tea mushroom, tea fungus, or Manchurian mushroom when referring to the culture; Latin name Medusomyces gisevii) is a fermented, lightly effervescent, sweetened black tea drink commonly consumed for its purported health benefits. Sometimes the beverage is called kombucha tea to distinguish it from the culture of bacteria and yeast. Juice, spices, fruit or other flavorings are often added.

Kombucha is thought to have originated in China, where the drink is traditional. By the early 20th century it had spread to Russia, then other parts of Eastern Europe and Germany. Kombucha is now homebrewed globally, and also bottled and sold commercially. The global kombucha market was worth approximately billion .

Kombucha is produced by symbiotic fermentation of sugared tea using a symbiotic culture of bacteria and yeast (SCOBY) commonly called a "mother" or "mushroom". The microbial populations in a SCOBY vary. The yeast component generally includes Saccharomyces cerevisiae, along with other species; the bacterial component almost always includes Gluconacetobacter xylinus to oxidize yeast-produced alcohols to acetic acid (and other acids). Although the SCOBY is commonly called "tea fungus" or "mushroom", it is actually "a symbiotic growth of acetic acid bacteria and osmophilic yeast species in a zoogleal mat ". The living bacteria are said to be probiotic, one of the reasons for the popularity of the drink.

Numerous health benefits have been claimed to correlate with drinking kombucha; there is little evidence to support any of these claims. The beverage has caused rare serious adverse effects, possibly arising from contamination during home preparation. It is not recommended for therapeutic purposes.

History 
Kombucha most likely originated in the Bohai Sea district in China. The drink was consumed in Russia and from there entered the rest of Europe. Its consumption increased in the United States during the early 21st century. Having an alcohol content of less than 0.5%, kombucha is not a federally regulated beverage in the United States.

Prior to 2015, some commercially available kombucha brands were found to contain alcohol content exceeding this threshold, sparking the development of new testing methods. With rising popularity in developed countries in the early 21st century, kombucha sales increased after it was marketed as an alternative to beer and other alcoholic drinks in restaurants and pubs.

According to Grand View Research, Kombucha had a global market size of billion  and this was expected to grow to billion by 2027.

Etymology and terminology
In Japanese, the term  refers to a kelp tea made with powdered konbu (an edible kelp from the family Laminariaceae) and is a completely different beverage from the fermented tea usually associated with kombucha elsewhere in the world.  

The etymology of kombucha is uncertain; however, it is speculated that it is a misapplied loanword from Japanese. It has been hypothesized that English speakers mistook the Japanese word kombucha to mean fermented tea, when in fact, fermented tea in Japanese is called . Webster's Dictionary maintains that the use of kombucha in English likely stems from the misapplication of Japanese words: kombucha, kobucha 'tea made from kelp', kobu, konbu 'kelp', and cha 'tea'. The American Heritage Dictionary offers further insight into the etymology of kombucha, stating that it was "perhaps... used by English speakers to designate fermented tea due to confusion or because the thick gelatinous film produced by the kombucha culture was thought to resemble seaweed."

The first known use in the English language of the word kombucha to describe "a gelatinous mass of symbiotic bacteria (as Acetobacter xylinum) and yeasts (as of the genera Brettanomyces and Saccharomyces) grown to produce a fermented beverage held to confer health benefits" was in 1944.

Composition and properties

Biological
A kombucha culture is a symbiotic culture of bacteria and yeast (SCOBY), similar to mother of vinegar, containing one or more species each of bacteria and yeasts, which form a zoogleal mat known as a "mother". There is a broad spectrum of yeast species spanning several genera reported to be present in kombucha culture including species of Zygosaccharomyces, Candida, Kloeckera/Hanseniaspora, Torulaspora, Pichia, Brettanomyces/Dekkera, Saccharomyces, Lachancea, Saccharomycoides, Schizosaccharomyces, Kluyveromyces, Starmera, Eremothecium, Merimbla, Sugiyamaella.

The bacterial component of kombucha comprises several species, almost always including the acetic acid bacteria Komagataeibacter xylinus (formerly Gluconacetobacter xylinus), which ferments alcohols produced by the yeasts into acetic and other acids, increasing the acidity and limiting ethanol content. The population of bacteria and yeasts found to produce acetic acid has been reported to increase for the first 4 days of fermentation, decreasing thereafter. K. xylinus produces bacterial cellulose, and is reportedly responsible for most or all of the physical structure of the "mother", which may have been selectively encouraged over time for firmer (denser) and more robust cultures by brewers. The highest diversity of Kombucha bacteria was found to be on the 7th day of fermentation with the diversity being less in the SCOBY. Acetobacteraceae dominate 88 percent of the bacterial community of the SCOBY. The acetic acid bacteria in kombucha are aerobic, meaning that they require oxygen for their growth and activity. Hence, the bacteria initially migrate and assemble at the air interface, followed by excretion of bacterial cellulose after about 2 days.

The mixed, presumably symbiotic culture has been further described as being lichenous, in accord with the reported presence of the known lichenous natural product usnic acid, though as of 2015, no report appears indicating the standard cyanobacterial species of lichens in association with kombucha fungal components.

Chemical composition
Kombucha is made by adding the kombucha culture into a broth of sugared tea. The sugar serves as a nutrient for the SCOBY that allows for bacterial growth in the tea. Sucrose is converted, biochemically, into fructose and glucose, and these into gluconic acid and acetic acid. In addition, kombucha contains enzymes and amino acids, polyphenols, and various other organic acids which vary between preparations. Other specific components include ethanol (see below), glucuronic acid, glycerol, lactic acid, usnic acid (a hepatotoxin, see above), and B-vitamins. Kombucha has also been found to contain vitamin C.

The alcohol content of kombucha is usually less than 0.5%, but increases with extended fermentation times.  The concentration of alcohol specifically ethanol increases initially but then begins to decrease when acetic acid bacteria utilize it to produce acetic acid. Over-fermentation generates high amounts of acids similar to vinegar. The pH of the drink is typically about 3.5.

Production 

Kombucha can be prepared at home or commercially. Kombucha is made by dissolving sugar in non-chlorinated boiling water. Tea leaves are steeped in the hot sugar water and discarded. The sweetened tea is cooled and the SCOBY culture is added. The mixture is then poured into a sterilized beaker along with previously fermented kombucha tea to lower the pH, this technique is known as "backslopping". The container is covered with a paper towel or breathable fabric to prevent insects such as fruit flies from contaminating the kombucha.

The tea is left to ferment for a period of up to 10 to 14 days at room temperature (18°C to 26°C). A new "daughter" SCOBY will form on the surface of the tea to the diameter of the container. After fermentation is completed, the SCOBY is removed and stored along with a small amount of the newly fermented tea. The remaining kombucha is strained and bottled for a secondary ferment for a few days or stored at a temperature of 4 °C.

Commercially bottled kombucha became available in the late 1990s. In 2010, elevated alcohol levels were found in many bottled kombucha products, leading retailers including Whole Foods to temporarily pull the drinks from store shelves. In response, kombucha suppliers reformulated their products to have lower alcohol levels.

By 2014, US sales of bottled kombucha were $400 million, $350 million of which was earned by Millennium Products, Inc. which sells GT's Kombucha. In 2014, the companies that make and sell kombucha formed a trade organization, Kombucha Brewers International. In 2016, PepsiCo purchased kombucha maker KeVita for approximately $200 million. In the US, sales of kombucha and other fermented drinks rose by 37 percent in 2017. Beer companies like Full Sail Brewing Company and Molson Coors Beverage Company produce kombucha by themselves or via subsidiaries.

As of 2021, the drink had some popularity in India's National Capital Region, partly due to its success in the west.

Hard kombucha 
As of 2019, some commercial kombucha producers sell "hard kombucha" with an alcohol content of over 5 percent.

Health claims 

Many people drink kombucha tea for its purported health benefits.  These include claims for treating AIDS, aging, anorexia nervosa, arthritis, atherosclerosis, cancer, constipation, and diabetes. There have not been any human trials conducted to assess its possible biological effects, and the purported health benefits resulting from its biological activities have not been demonstrated in humans. A 2003 systematic review characterized kombucha as an "extreme example" of an unconventional remedy because of the disparity between implausible, wide-ranging health claims and the potential risks of the product. It concluded that the proposed, unsubstantiated therapeutic claims did not outweigh known risks, and that kombucha should not be recommended for therapeutic use, being in a class of "remedies that only seem to benefit those who sell them". As of 2019, the drink's physiological effects on people are largely unknown.

Adverse effects
Reports of adverse effects related to kombucha consumption are rare, but may be underreported, according to the 2003 review. The American Cancer Society says that "Serious side effects and occasional deaths have been associated with drinking Kombucha tea". Because kombucha is a commonly homemade fermentation, caution should be taken because pathogenic microorganisms can contaminate the tea during preparation.

Adverse effects associated with kombucha consumption include severe hepatic (liver) and renal (kidney) toxicity as well as metabolic acidosis. At least one person is known to have died after consuming kombucha, though the drink itself has never been conclusively proven as the cause of death.

Some adverse health effects may arise from the acidity of the tea causing acidosis, and brewers are cautioned to avoid over-fermentation. Other adverse effects may be a result of bacterial or fungal contamination during the brewing process. Some studies have found the hepatotoxin usnic acid in kombucha, although it is not known whether the cases of liver damage are due to usnic acid or to some other toxin.

Drinking kombucha can be harmful for people with preexisting ailments. Due to its microbial sourcing and possible non-sterile packaging, kombucha is not recommended for people with poor immune function, women who are pregnant or nursing, or children under 4 years old. It may compromise immune responses or stomach acidity in these susceptible populations. There are certain drugs that one should not take at the same time as kombucha because of the small percentage of alcohol content.

A 2019 systematic review confirmed the numerous health risks, but said "kombucha is not considered harmful if about 4 oz [120 mL] per day is consumed by healthy individuals; potential risks are associated with a low pH brew leaching heavy metals from containers, excessive consumption of highly acidic kombucha, or consumption by individuals with pre-existing health conditions."

Other uses 
Kombucha culture, when dried, becomes a leather-like textile known as a microbial cellulose that can be molded onto forms to create seamless clothing. Using different broth media such as coffee, black tea, and green tea to grow the kombucha culture results in different textile colors, although the textile can also be dyed using other plant-based dyes. Different growth media and dyes also change the textile's feel and texture. Additionally the SCOBY itself can be dried and eaten as a sweet or savory snack.

See also

 Jilly Juice, a fermented drink with claimed health benefits
 Jun, a fermented drink made from green tea and honey
 Kefir, a fermented dairy product
 Kvass, a traditional fermented drink made from bread
 List of unproven or disproven cancer treatments
 Posca, Roman vinegary drink
 Tibicos, or "water kefir"

References

External links

Alternative medicine
Articles containing video clips
Blended tea
Carbonated drinks
Chinese teas
Fermented drinks
Fermented tea
Mycology
Toxicology
2010s in food
Manchuria